The UCLA–UC Santa Barbara men's soccer rivalry or the 101 derby is a men's college soccer rivalry between the Los Angeles and Santa Barbara campuses of the University of California System. The rivalry dates back to 1967, when the two programs first played each other. The rivalry stems from the program's proximity and the vying for talent in the Southern California region, long considered a hotbed for soccer talent in the United States.

Overall, the two programs have played 45 times, with UCLA historically dominating the series, holding a 35–6–4 advantage over UCSB. The rivalry has become more competitive in recent times, with UCLA holding a 7–4–2 advantage dating back to the 2006 NCAA Division I Men's Soccer Tournament, where UCSB defeated UCLA in the final to win their first national championship. 

In 2007, the college soccer website, CollegeSoccerNews.com rated the rivalry as the seventh-best college soccer rivalry in the nation.

Rivalry

History 
UCLA began their soccer program in the late 1930s, while UC Santa Barbara began their soccer program in the mid 1960s. The first meeting between the two sides was in 1967, where UCLA posted a 3–1 victory over UCSB. UCLA would win every encounter between the two sides until 1982, when UCSB registered its first win against UCLA.

For much of the rivalry until the 21st century, the series was heavily lopsided in favor of UCLA. In 2006, the series became more intense when the two sides met in St. Louis for the 2006 NCAA Championship Game, which UCSB emerged victorious. Since then, the rivalry has been more evenly split between the two sides.

Series 

Sources:

Notes

References 

College soccer rivalries in the United States
UCLA Bruins men's soccer
UC Santa Barbara Gauchos men's soccer
Soccer in Los Angeles
1967 establishments in California